Gorgor District is one of five districts of the province Cajatambo in Peru.

Geography 
Some of the highest mountains of the district are listed below:

References